The French destroyer Vautour was one of six  (contre-torpilleurs) built for the French Navy in the interwar period.

In Vichy French service after France surrendered to Germany in June 1940, Vautour was scuttled at Toulon, France, on 27 November 1942 to prevent her capture by the Germans when Germany occupied Vichy France. Later refloated, she was sunk again in an Allied air raid on Toulon on 4 February 1944.

Notes

References

 
 

World War II warships scuttled at Toulon
Aigle-class destroyers
1930 ships
Ships built in France
Maritime incidents in November 1942
Maritime incidents in February 1944
Destroyers sunk by aircraft